Porphyrazines, or tetraazaporphyrins, are tetrapyrrole macrocycles similar to porphyrins and phthalocyanines. Pioneered by Sir R. Patrick Linstead as an extension of his work on phthalocyanines, porphyrazines differ from porphyrins in that they contain -meso nitrogen atoms, rather than carbon atoms, and differ from phthalocyanines in that their β-pyrrole positions are open for substitution. These differences confer physical properties that are distinct from both porphyrins and phthalocyanines.

Synthesis
Porphyrazines are prepared by magnesium templated cyclization of maleonitriles. Cross-cyclization with phthalonitrile or diiminoisoindole derivatives is possible introducing a flexibile synthetic route that has led to the synthesis of porphyrazines with peripheral heterocyclic rings, heteroatom substituents (S, O, N), peripherally bound metal atoms, and mixed -benzo porphyrazine systems.

Optical properties
Porphyrazines are most well known for their intense electronic absorption throughout the UV, visible, and NIR spectral regions. Electronic absorption spectra for porphyrazines are similar to those of phthalocyanines, with an intense Soret band (λ ≈ 300 - 400 nm) and Q-band (λ > 600 nm).

Porphyrazines exhibit fluorescence from the first excited singlet state (S1 → S0) at visible and NIR wavelengths which is typical of tetrapyrrole macrocycles. Dual-emission from organic fluorophores is not common but, as observed in phthalocyanines, violet emission from an upper excited state (S2 → S0) is observed in porphyrazines.

References 

Tetrapyrroles